The Cessna Citation II are light corporate jets built by Cessna as part of the Citation family.
Stretched from the Citation I, the Model 550 was announced in September 1976, first flew on January 31, 1977, and was certified in March 1978.

The II/SP is a single pilot version, the improved S/II first flew on February 14, 1984 and the Citation Bravo, a stretched S/II with new avionics and more powerful P&WC PW530A turbofans, first flew on April 25, 1995. The United States Navy adopted a version of the S/II as the T-47A.

Production ceased in 2006 after  of all variants were delivered.

Design and development

The stretched Citation was announced in September 1976, it first flew on January 31 1977 and FAA certification was awarded in March 1978. As the II and II/SP are otherwise largely similar, the  reduction in MTOW of the II/SP often mandates operating with a reduced fuel load, shortening the aircraft's loaded range compared to the standard II. Both the II and II/SP require special training to be operated by a single pilot. A total of 688 II and II/SP aircraft were delivered.

Citation S/II

The improved Citation S/II (Model S550) was announced in October 1983 and first flew on February 14, 1984, before certification in July.
It gained a supercritical airfoil with swept wing roots, aileron and flap gap seals, and a fluid deicing system instead of the pneumatic deicing boots used on earlier Citations.
To further reduce drag, the fuselage and engine nacelle pylons were redesigned, and nacelle fairings were added.
The improved  JT15D-4B engines had higher temperature-rated components, allowing more thrust at higher altitudes.

Deliveries of the S/II amounted to 160, including fifteen T-47A aircraft purchased by the U.S. Navy. The S/II's higher performance coupled with its lower production numbers led to substantially higher demand on the used aircraft market compared to the standard II and II/SP.

Government variants
The US Customs & Border Protection purchased ten Citation IIs configured with fire control radar (initially the F-16's AN/APG-66(V), later the Selex ES Vixen 500E system) and the WF-360TL imaging system. These aircraft have been used effectively in Panama, Honduras, Colombia, Peru, Venezuela, Mexico and Aruba. The similar OT-47B aircraft are based on the Cessna Citation V airframe.

The T-47A was a modified version of the Citation S/II (Model 552) for the U.S. Navy, featuring a  wingspan reduction and hydraulically boosted ailerons for enhanced maneuverability,  thrust JT15D-5 engines, a cockpit roof window for better pilot visibility during hard maneuvering, strengthened windshields for protection against bird strikes during high-speed low-altitude sorties, multiple radar consoles, and the AN/APQ-167 radar system. Intended to replace the North American T-39D as a radar systems trainer aircraft, fifteen aircraft were purchased in 1984 to train naval radar intercept officers.

All T-47A aircraft were operated with civil aircraft registration numbers by Training Air Squadron VT-86 based at Naval Air Station Pensacola, Florida. On 20 July 1993, thirteen of the fifteen aircraft were destroyed when a roofing contractor accidentally set fire to a hangar at Forbes Field where the aircraft were being stored by Cessna. The navy replaced the lost trainers with upgraded T-39D aircraft and the two survivors were transferred to civil owners.

Citation Bravo

The Citation Bravo first flew on April 25, 1995, was granted certification in August 1996, and was first delivered in February 1997.
It features new P&WC PW530A turbofans, modern Honeywell Primus EFIS avionics, a revised Citation Ultra interior and a trailing link main undercarriage.
Production of the Bravo ceased in late 2006 after 336 had been delivered.

Its more efficient PW530A generates 15% more thrust at takeoff and 23% more at altitude.
The engine overhaul every 4,000 hours cost $1 million or $275 at power by the Hour.
In 2018, early 1997 models starts at $800,000, up to $1.7 million for 2006 planes. The Bravo was replaced by the better-but-more-expensive Citation CJ3.
The competing Beechjet 400A is roomier and faster but needs more fuel and more runway, while the compact Learjet 31A is faster but has less range. The faster and more expensive Citation V Ultra has a longer cabin but consumes more fuel.

Upgrades

By December 2006, Clifford Development in Ohio had launched a program to re-engine Citation IIs with  Williams FJ44-3 engines for $1.9 million.
Clifford expected a STC within 12 months, 21% faster long-range cruise, 29% longer range, 34% better single-engine climb rate and 20% better fuel efficiency.
By May 2007, Sierra Industries in Texas was also developing a similar modification, as 900 Citations qualify for it, directly as a broker and MRO provider, while Clifford should license its STC.

In September 2008, the FAA granted a STC to Sierra Industries.
The Super S-II made its first flight on September 26.
The conversion cost $1.9 million in 2009, resulting in a $3.5-4.6 million value for a converted Citation II.
Ceiling is increased from FL 410 to FL 430, reached directly in 25 min at max takeoff weight with a thrust increased from  each.
Dual-channel FADEC allows a much lower residual thrust, eliminating the need for thrust reversers.

The re-engined S550 can reach  at FL270.
Clifford and its partner Stevens Aviation could also update the flight deck with Collins ProLine 21 avionics and refurbish the cabin.
Clifford was touting a 14% faster optimum cruise speed, and a 32% lower fuel burn for the S550.
Sierra was announcing a  IFR/VFR range for the re-engined Super II; or a  IFR/VFR range for the re-engined Super S-II.
By June 2012, Sierra Industries had re-engined 59 various Citations with FJ44s, among avionics retrofit and airframe modifications.

Variants
 (Model 550), stretched development of the Model 500 with increased wingspan, fuel capacity and gross weight, first produced in 1978. Initially replaced by the S/II in production, but was brought back and produced side by side with the S/II until the Bravo was introduced.
Citation II/SP (Model 551), single-pilot version of Model 550 with reduced gross weight.
 (Model S550), development of Model 550 introduced in 1984 featuring a supercritical wing with swept wing roots, increased fuel capacity, and various minor improvements. Initially replaced the II in production.
T-47A (Model 552), U.S. Navy radar systems trainer version of S/II with a shortened wingspan, strengthened windshields, cockpit roof windows, more powerful JT15D-5 engines and military equipment.
Citation Bravo (Model 550 Bravo), updated S/II with new PW530A engines, landing gear and Primus 1000 avionics.<ref name="aero-techbravo">[http://www.aerospace-technology.com/projects/cessna_bravo/ "Cessna Citation Bravo Light Business Jet Cessna Citation Bravo Light Business Jet, USA", Aerospace-Technology.com]</ref> The last Citation Bravo rolled off the production line in late 2006, ending a nearly 10-year production run of 337 aircraft.

Operators

Military operators

Civilian operators

Tyrol Air Ambulance

Airline operator

The Citation was also operated by at least one airline in scheduled passenger service being Enterprise Airlines in the U.S. from the late 1980s to 1990.

Accidents and incidents

On September 4, 2022, a Cessna 551 heading from Jerez, Spain did not land at its intended destination, Cologne, Germany, but instead kept flying across Germany and the Baltic Sea where it eventually ran out of fuel and crashed in the sea off Ventspils, Latvia. The pilot had reported problems with air conditioning and pressurization early in the flight but later stopped responding to communications. A possible cause of the crash is that loss of cabin pressure rendered everyone on board unconscious.

Specifications (Cessna S550 Citation S/II)

See also

References

 Hoyle, Craig. "World Air Forces Directory". Flight International, Vol. 182, No. 5370, 11–17 December 2012. pp. 40–64. .
 Hoyle, Craig. "World Air Forces Directory". Flight International, Vol. 188, No. 5517, 8–14 December 2015. pp. 26–53. .
 Hoyle, Craig, Farfad, Antoine. "World Air Forces Directory". Flight International, Vol. 196, No. 5715, 10–16 December 2019. pp. 26–54. .
 Lambert, Mark. Jane's All the World's Aircraft 1993–94''. Coulsdon, UK: Jane's Data Division, 1993. .
 .

External links

 Airliners.net aircraft description page

Citation II
1970s United States business aircraft
Twinjets
Low-wing aircraft
Cruciform tail aircraft
1980s United States military trainer aircraft
Citation 002
Aircraft first flown in 1977